WKJQ (1550 AM) was a daytime-only radio station broadcasting a religious format. Formerly licensed to Parsons, Tennessee, United States, the station was owned by Clenney Broadcasting Corporation.

WKJQ went silent on July 2, 2012. On September 13, 2012, Clenney Broadcasting surrendered the station's license to the Federal Communications Commission (FCC). The FCC cancelled the station's license and deleted the WKJQ call sign from their database.

References

External links

Defunct religious radio stations in the United States
KJQ
Decatur County, Tennessee
Radio stations disestablished in 2012
Defunct radio stations in the United States
2012 disestablishments in Tennessee
KJQ
KJQ